Podyarugi is a rural locality (a selo) in Prokhorovsky District, Belgorod Oblast, Russia. The population was 83 as of 2010. There are 6 streets.

Geography 
Podyarugi is located 28 km southeast of Prokhorovka (the district's administrative centre) by road. Klinovy is the nearest rural locality.

References 

Rural localities in Prokhorovsky District